The Metropolitan School District of Boone Township is the school system that serves Boone Township, Porter County, Indiana, USA.  Boone Township's largest and only town is Hebron, Indiana. Jeff Brooks is the superintendent.

Schools
 Hebron High School
 Hebron Middle School
 Hebron Elementary School

References

External links
 

Boone Township
Education in Porter County, Indiana